The Himalayan serow (Capricornis sumatraensis thar), also known as the thar, is a subspecies of the mainland serow native to the Himalayas. It was previously considered its own species, as Capricornis thar. It is the official state animal of the Indian state of Mizoram.

Taxonomy 
In 1831, Brian Houghton Hodgson first described a goat-like animal with short annulated horns occurring in montane regions between the Sutlej and Teesta Rivers under the name "Bubaline Antelope". As "Bubaline" was preoccupied, he gave it the scientific name Antelope thar a few months later.
When William Ogilby described the genus Capricornis in 1838, he determined the Himalayan serow as type species of this genus.

Description
The Himalayan serow is mostly blackish, with flanks, hindquarters, and upper legs that are a rusty red; its lower legs are whitish.

Distribution and habitat 

Conservation 
Capricornis sumatraensis is listed in CITES Appendix I.

Notes

References

Himalayan serow
Fauna of Eastern Himalaya
Fauna of Sikkim
Himalayan serow
Symbols of Mizoram